Lorenz Chrysanth Edler von Vest (18 November 1776, in Klagenfurt – 15 December 1840, in Graz) was an Austrian physician and botanist.

He studied medicine in Vienna and at the University of Freiburg, where in 1798 he received his doctorate. After a stint in the military, he settled into a medical practice in his hometown of Klagenfurt (1800). From 1804 to 1812 he taught classes in theoretical and practical medicine at the lyceum in Klagenfurt, and afterwards worked as a professor of botany and chemistry at the Johanneum in Graz. In 1829 he was appointed chief regional physician and health advisor to the Styrian government.

In 1809 the plant genus Vestia (family Solanaceae) was named on his honor by Carl Ludwig Willdenow.

Selected works 
 Manuale botanicum inserviens excursionibus botanicus, sistens stirpes totius Germaniaephanerogamas, 1805.
 Anleitung zum gründlichen Studium der Botanik, 1818 – Instructions for the thorough study of botany.
 Versuch einer systematischen Zusammenstellung der in Steyermark cultivirten Weinreben, 1826 – Essay on a systematic compilation of vines cultivated in Styria.

References 

1776 births
1840 deaths
Scientists from Klagenfurt
19th-century Austrian physicians
University of Freiburg alumni
19th-century Austrian botanists
Edlers of Austria